Naya may refer to:

People

Given name
 Naya (singer), (born 1992), Lebanese singer
 Naya Rivera (1987–2020), American actress and singer
 Naya Tapper (born 1994), American rugby union player

Surname
 Beverly Naya (born 1989), British-Nigerian actress
 Carlo Naya (1816–1882), Italian photographer
 Gorō Naya (1929–2013), Japanese voice actor
 José Naya (1896–1977), Uruguayan footballer
 Kōki Naya (1940–2013), birth name of Taihō Kōki, Japanese sumo wrestler
 Rokurō Naya (1932–2014), Japanese voice actor

Other uses 
 Naya, Myanmar
 Naya River, in Colombia
 Naya Waters, a Canadian water bottler
 Naya, a 1982 album by Congolese musician King Kester Emeneya
 Naya, a concept in Jainism; see Anekantavada
 Nāya, the ancient Indo-Aryan tribe in which the Jain Tirthankara Mahavira was born